The Miss Wyoming Teen USA competition is the pageant that selects the representative for the state of Wyoming in the Miss Teen USA pageant.

Wyoming's highest placement was at Miss Teen USA 1985 when Emily Ernst placed first runner-up to Kelly Hu of Hawaii.

Five Miss Wyoming Teen USA winners have gone on to win the Miss Wyoming USA title and compete at Miss USA.

Nora Steinke of Laramie was crowned Miss Wyoming Teen USA 2022 on June 18, 2022, at John F. Welsh Auditorium on Natrona County High School in Casper. She will represent Wyoming for the title of Miss Teen USA 2022 in October 2022.

Results summary

Placements
Wyoming holds a record of nine placements at Miss Teen USA:
1st runner-up: Emily Ernst (1985)
Top 5: Gina DeBernardi (1998)
Top 15/16: Mollie Smith (2007), Amy David (2009), Caroline Scott (2010), Sydney Graus (2012), Autumn Schieferstein (2017), Grace Turner (2019), Teryn Thatcher (2021)

Winners 

1 Age at the time of the Miss Teen USA pageant

References

Wyoming
Women in Wyoming
1983 establishments in Wyoming